Chiruca is a 1946 Argentine film.

Cast
Benito Perojo (director)
Elisa Galvé
Catalina Bárcena
Ricardo Passano
Manuel Collado
Homero Cárpena
Carmen Lamas
Delfy de Ortega
Eduardo González
Paquita Mas
Vicente Ariño
 Fernando Iglesias 'Tacholas

External links
 

1946 films
1940s Spanish-language films
Argentine black-and-white films
1940s Argentine films